A refrigerant is a working fluid used in the refrigeration cycle of air conditioning systems and heat pumps where in most cases they undergo a repeated phase transition from a liquid to a gas and back again. Refrigerants are heavily regulated due to their toxicity, flammability and the contribution of CFC and HCFC refrigerants to ozone depletion and that of HFC refrigerants to climate change.

Refrigerants are used in a Direct Expansion (DX) system to transfer energy from one environment to another, typically from inside a building to outside (or vice versa) commonly known as an "air conditioner" or "heat pump". Refrigerants can carry per kg 10 times more energy than water and 50 times more than air. 

Refrigerants are controlled substances due to 1) High Pressures (100-145 psi), 2) Extreme temperatures (-50°C to 145°C), 3) Flammability A1 class non-flammable, A2/A2L class flammable & A3 class extremely flammable/explosive and 4) Toxicity B1-low, B2-medium & B3-high, as classified by ISO 817 & ASHRAE 34. 

Refrigerants must only be handled by qualified/certified engineers to the relevant classes of refrigerant eg in the UK C&G 2079 if A1 class PLUS C&G 6187-2 if A2/A2L & A3 class refrigerants.

History 

The first air conditioners and refrigerators employed toxic or flammable gases, such as ammonia, sulfur dioxide, methyl chloride, or propane, that could result in fatal accidents when they leaked.

In 1928 Thomas Midgley Jr. created the first non-flammable, non-toxic chlorofluorocarbon gas, Freon (R-12). The name is a trademark name owned by DuPont (now Chemours) for any chlorofluorocarbon (CFC), hydrochlorofluorocarbon (HCFC), or hydrofluorocarbon (HFC) refrigerant. Following the discovery of better synthesis methods, CFCs such as R-11, R-12, R-123 and R-502 dominated the market.

Phasing out of CFCs 

In the early 1980s, scientists discovered that CFCs were causing major damage to the ozone layer that protects the earth from ultraviolet radiation, and to the ozone holes over polar regions. This led to the signing of the Montreal Protocol in 1987 which aimed to phase out CFCs and HCFC but did not address the contributions that HFCs made to climate change. The adoption of HCFCs such as R-22, and R-123 was accelerated and so were used in most U.S. homes in air conditioners and in chillers from the 1980s as they have a dramatically lower Ozone Depletion Potential (ODP) than CFCs, but their ODP was still not zero which led to their eventual phase-out.

Hydrofluorocarbons (HFCs) such as R-134a, R-143a, R-407a, R-407c, R-404a and R-410a (a 50/50 blend of R-125/R-32) were promoted as replacements for CFCs and HCFCs in the 1990s and 2000s. HFCs were not ozone-depleting but did have global warming potentials (GWPs) thousands of times greater than CO2 with atmospheric lifetimes that can extend for decades. This in turn, starting from the 2010s, led to the adoption in new equipment of Hydrocarbon and HFO (hydrofluoroolefin) refrigerants R-32, R-290, R-600a, R-454b, R-1234yf, R-514A, R-744, R-1234ze and R-1233zd, which have both an ODP of zero and a lower GWP.

The environmental organization Greenpeace provided funding to a former East German refrigerator company to research alternative ozone- and climate-safe refrigerants in 1992. The company developed hydrocarbon mixes such as isopentane and isobutane, propane and isobutane, or pure isobutane, called "Greenfreeze", but as a condition of the contract with Greenpeace could not patent the technology, which led to their widespread adoption by other firms. Policy and political influence by corporate executives resisted change however, citing the flammability and explosive properties of the refrigerants, and DuPont together with other companies blocked them in the U.S. with the U.S. EPA.

Beginning on 14 November 1994, the U.S. Environmental Protection Agency restricted the sale, possession and use of refrigerants to only licensed technicians, per rules under sections 608 and 609 of the Clean Air Act. In 1995, Germany made CFC refrigerators illegal.

In 1996 Eurammon, a European non-profit initiative for natural refrigerants, was established and comprises European companies, institutions, and industry experts.

In 1997, FCs and HFCs were included in the Kyoto Protocol to the Framework Convention on Climate Change.

In 2000 in the UK, the Ozone Regulations came into force which banned the use of ozone-depleting HCFC refrigerants such as R22 in new systems. The Regulation banned the use of R22 as a "top-up" fluid for maintenance from 2010 for virgin fluid and from 2015 for recycled fluid.

Addressing greenhouse gases 
With growing interest in natural refrigerants as alternatives to synthetic refrigerants such as CFCs, HCFCs and HFCs, in 2004, Greenpeace worked with multinational corporations like Coca-Cola and Unilever, and later Pepsico and others, to create a corporate coalition called Refrigerants Naturally!. Four years later, Ben & Jerry's of Unilever and General Electric began to take steps to support production and use in the U.S. It is estimated that almost 75 percent of the refrigeration and air conditioning sector has the potential to be converted to natural refrigerants.

In 2006, the EU adopted a Regulation on fluorinated greenhouse gases (FCs and HFCs) to encourage to transition to natural refrigerants (such as hydrocarbons). It was reported in 2010 that some refrigerants are being used as recreational drugs, leading to an extremely dangerous phenomenon known as inhalant abuse.

From 2011 the European Union started to phase out refrigerants with a global warming potential (GWP) of more than 150 in automotive air conditioning (GWP = 100-year warming potential of one kilogram of a gas relative to one kilogram of CO2) such as the refrigerant HFC-134a (known as R-134a in North America) which has a GWP of 1526. In the same year the EPA decided in favour of the ozone- and climate-safe refrigerant for U.S. manufacture.

A 2018 study by the nonprofit organization "Drawdown" put proper refrigerant management and disposal at the very top of the list of climate impact solutions, with an impact equivalent to eliminating over 17 years of US carbon dioxide emissions.

In 2019 it was estimated that CFCs, HCFCs, and HFCs were responsible for about 10% of direct radiative forcing from all long-lived anthropogenic greenhouse gases. and in the same year the UNEP published new voluntary guidelines, however many countries have not yet ratified the Kigali Amendment.

From early 2020 HFCs (including R-404a, R-134a and R-410a) are being superseded: Residential air-conditioning systems and heat pumps are increasingly using R-32. This still has a GWP of more than 600. Progressive devices use refrigerants with almost no climate impact, namely R-290 (propane), R-600 (isobutane) or R-1234yf (less flammable, in cars). In commercial refrigeration also  (R-744) can be used.

Desirable properties
The ideal refrigerant would be: non-corrosive, non-toxic, non-flammable, with no ozone depletion and global warming potential. It should preferably be natural with well-studied and low environmental impact. It also needs to have: a boiling point that is somewhat below the target temperature (although boiling point can be adjusted by adjusting the pressure appropriately), a high heat of vaporization, a moderate density in liquid form, a relatively high density in gaseous form (which can also be adjusted by setting pressure appropriately), and a high critical temperature. Extremely high pressures should be avoided. Newer refrigerants address the issue of the damage that CFCs caused to the ozone layer and the contribution that HCFCs make to climate change, but some do raise issues relating to toxicity and/or flammability.

Common refrigerants

Refrigerants with very low climate impact
With increasing regulations, refrigerants with a very low global warming potential are expected to play a dominant role in the 21st century, in particular, R-290 and R-1234yf. Starting from almost no market share in 2018, low GWPO devices are gaining market share in 2022.

Most used

Banned / Phased out

Other

Refrigerant reclamation and disposal 

Coolant and refrigerants are found throughout the industrialized world, in homes, offices, and factories, in devices such as refrigerators, air conditioners, central air conditioning systems (HVAC), freezers, and dehumidifiers. When these units are serviced, there is a risk that refrigerant gas will be vented into the atmosphere either accidentally or intentionally, hence the creation of technician training and certification programs in order to ensure that the material is conserved and managed safely. Mistreatment of these gases has been shown to deplete the ozone layer and is suspected to contribute to global warming.

With the exception of isobutane and propane (R600a, R441a and R290), ammonia and CO2 under Section 608 of the United States' Clean Air Act it is illegal to knowingly release any refrigerants into the atmosphere.

Refrigerant reclamation is the act of processing used refrigerant gas which has previously been used in some type of refrigeration loop such that it meets specifications for new refrigerant gas. In the United States, the Clean Air Act of 1990 requires that used refrigerant be processed by a certified reclaimer, which must be licensed by the United States Environmental Protection Agency (EPA), and the material must be recovered and delivered to the reclaimer by EPA-certified technicians.

Classification of refrigerants 

Refrigerants may be divided into three classes according to their manner of absorption or extraction of heat from the substances to be refrigerated:
 Class 1: This class includes refrigerants that cool by phase change (typically boiling), using the refrigerant's latent heat.
 Class 2: These refrigerants cool by temperature change or 'sensible heat', the quantity of heat being the specific heat capacity x the temperature change. They are air, calcium chloride brine, sodium chloride brine, alcohol, and similar nonfreezing solutions. The purpose of Class 2 refrigerants is to receive a reduction of temperature from Class 1 refrigerants and convey this lower temperature to the area to be cooled.
 Class 3: This group consists of solutions that contain absorbed vapors of liquefiable agents or refrigerating media. These solutions function by nature of their ability to carry liquefiable vapors, which produce a cooling effect by the absorption of their heat of solution. They can also be classified into many categories.

The R-# numbering system was developed by DuPont (which owned the Freon trademark), and systematically identifies the molecular structure of refrigerants made with a single halogenated hydrocarbon. The meaning of the codes is as follows:
 For saturated hydrocarbons, subtracting 90 from the concatenated numbers of carbon, hydrogen and fluorine atoms, respectively gives the assigned R#.
 If bromine is present, the number is followed by a capital B and then the number of bromine atoms.
 Remaining bonds not accounted for are occupied by chlorine atoms.
 A suffix of a lower-case letter a, b, or c indicates increasingly unsymmetrical isomers.
For example, R-134a has 2 carbon atoms, 2 hydrogen atoms, and 4 fluorine atoms, an empirical formula of tetrafluoroethane. The "a" suffix indicates that the isomer is unbalanced by one atom, giving 1,1,1,2-Tetrafluoroethane. R-134 (without the "a" suffix) would have a molecular structure of 1,1,2,2-Tetrafluoroethane.

 The R-400 series is made up of zeotropic blends (those where the boiling point of constituent compounds differs enough to lead to changes in relative concentration because of fractional distillation) and the R-500 series is made up of so-called azeotropic blends. The rightmost digit is assigned arbitrarily by ASHRAE, an industry standards organization.
 The R-700 series is made up of non-organic refrigerants, also designated by ASHRAE.

The same numbers are used with an R- prefix for generic refrigerants, with a "Propellant" prefix (e.g., "Propellant 12") for the same chemical used as a propellant for an aerosol spray, and with trade names for the compounds, such as "Freon 12". Recently, a practice of using abbreviations HFC- for hydrofluorocarbons, CFC- for chlorofluorocarbons, and HCFC- for hydrochlorofluorocarbons has arisen, because of the regulatory differences among these groups.

Refrigerant safety
ASHRAE Standard 34, Designation and Safety Classification of Refrigerants, assigns safety classifications to refrigerants based upon toxicity and flammability.

Using safety information provided by producers, ASHRAE assigns a capital letter to indicate toxicity and a number to indicate flammability.  The letter "A" is the least toxic and the number 1 is the least flammable.

See also
 Brine (Refrigerant)
 Section 608

References

Sources

IPCC reports
. https://archive.ipcc.ch/report/ar5/wg1/

Other

External links
 US Environmental Protection Agency page on the GWPs of various substances
 Green Cooling Initiative on alternative natural refrigerants cooling technologies
 International Institute of Refrigeration 

Heating, ventilation, and air conditioning
 
Industrial gases